The government of Miami-Dade County is defined and authorized under the Constitution of Florida, Florida law, and the Home Rule Charter of Miami-Dade County.

Since its formation in 1957, Miami-Dade County, Florida has had a two-tier system of government. Under this system, Miami-Dade comprises a large unincorporated area and 34 incorporated areas or municipalities. Each municipality has its own government and provides such city-type services as police and zoning protection.

History
State voters amended the State of Florida's Constitution in 1956 to allow for a Home Rule Charter. Dade County was granted the power to create commission districts, pass ordinances, create penalties, levy and collect taxes to support a centralized metropolitan form of government. The Board of County Commissioners may create municipalities, special taxing districts and other boards or authorities as needed.

The Home Rule Charter for Miami-Dade County was adopted by referendum on May 21, 1957. This predates the 1968 revision to the Florida Constitution, which radically altered home rule.

On November 13, 1997 voters changed the name of the county from Dade to Miami-Dade to acknowledge the international name recognition of Miami.

Overview

Unlike a consolidated city-county, where the city and county governments merge into a single entity, these two entities remain separate. Instead there are two "tiers", or levels, of government: city and county. There are 34 municipalities in the county, the City of Miami being the largest.

Cities are the "lower tier" of local government, providing police and fire protection, zoning and code enforcement, and other typical city services within their jurisdiction. These services are paid for by city taxes. The County is the "upper tier", and it provides services of a metropolitan nature, such as emergency management, airport and seaport operations, public housing and health care services, transportation, environmental services, solid waste disposal etc. These are funded by county taxes, which are assessed on all incorporated and unincorporated areas.

Of the county's 2,751,796 total residents (as of 2017), approximately 44% live in unincorporated areas, the majority of which are heavily urbanized. These residents are part of the Unincorporated Municipal Services Area (UMSA). For these residents, the County fills the role of both lower- and upper-tier government, the County Commission acting as their lower-tier municipal representative body. Residents within UMSA pay an UMSA tax, equivalent to a city tax, which is used to provide County residents with equivalent city services (police, fire, zoning, water and sewer, etc.). Residents of incorporated areas do not pay UMSA tax.

Organization
An Executive Mayor and the Miami-Dade Board of County Commissioners (BCC) govern the County. The County's main administrative offices are located in the Stephen P. Clark Center (SPCC) at 111 NW 1ST Street in downtown Miami.

Mayor

The Mayor is elected through a countywide vote and is not a member of the Commission. The Mayor has the power to veto actions of the Commission within ten days of their adoption. The Mayor appoints the County Manager, subject to the approval within 14 days of a majority of Commissioners. Both the Mayor and the Commission have the power to remove a County Manager, requiring a two-thirds vote of Commissioners then in office. No one elected as Mayor may serve more than two consecutive four-year terms. Each year the Mayor delivers a state of the county report (usually in January) and a budget address (usually in July). The post of mayor is currently held by Daniella Levine Cava.

Elected officers
The Miami-Dade County Attorney's Office provides legal representation to all aspects of Miami-Dade County government, including the Mayor and the 13-member Board of County Commissioners, the Property Appraiser, 25 county departments and numerous boards, authorities, councils and commissions. Abigail Price-Williams was appointed County Attorney effective October 2015. She previously served as First Assistant County Attorney from 2007 to 2015 and held the position of Acting County Attorney in 2007.

The Miami-Dade County Clerk is an elected constitutional officer as mandated by Article V, Section 16 of the Constitution of the State of Florida. The clerk serves as ex-officio clerk of the Board of County Commissioners, county recorder, county auditor, custodian of all county funds, custodian of all records filed with the Court. The Clerk is elected to a four-year term by the electorate of Miami-Dade County. In 1992, Harvey Ruvin was elected to the Office of Miami-Dade County Clerk of Courts. He has been re-elected five times, leading the ballot in 2016 with the largest vote total in South Florida's history.

The Miami-Dade Clerk of the Board is an elected official who provides direct administrative support to the Board of County Commissioners. The Clerk provides checks and balances in County Government and presides as the County's public trustee. Harvey Ruvin is also Clerk of the Board.

The Miami-Dade Property Appraiser acts as the head of the Office of the Property Appraiser. The Office's primary responsibility is to identify and appraise all real and tangible personal property within the County and certify the annual tax roll with the Florida Department of Revenue in accordance with State law.  Additional responsibilities include the maintenance of all associated property records, the administration of all exemptions, and the annual notification to all property owners in Miami-Dade County of the assessed value of their property. Pedro J. Garcia was first elected as Miami-Dade County Property Appraiser in 2008. After losing re-election in 2012 he was subsequently re-elected to office in a 2014 special election and was unopposed in the 2016 elections. He won re-election once again in 2020.

The Miami-Dade Inspector General has authority to review past, present and proposed County and Public Health Trust programs, accounts, records, contracts, and transactions. The OIG investigates allegations of fraud, waste, abuse and misconduct amongst public officials and County employees, as well as contractors and vendors doing business with the County. Felix Jimenez was appointed to the position of Inspector General by Miami-Dade Board of County Commissioners on August 31, 2020.

Board of County Commissioners
The Miami-Dade Board of County Commissioners is the governing body of unincorporated Miami-Dade County and has broad regional powers to establish policies for Miami-Dade County services. The government provides major metropolitan services countywide and city-type services for residents of unincorporated areas.

One County Commissioner is elected from each of Miami-Dade County's 13 districts to serve a four-year term. Residents choose only from among candidates running in the district in which they live. Commissioners are chosen in non-partisan, single-district elections and can serve two four-year staggered terms, with elections scheduled every two years. The Commissioners elect a Chairperson, and the Chairperson appoints the members, chairperson and vice chairperson of all standing committees.

The BCC reviews and adopts comprehensive development plans for the county, licenses and regulates taxi, jitneys, limousines and rental cars; sets tolls and provide public transportation systems, regulate utilities, adopt and enforce building codes, establish zoning controls, provide public health facilities, cultural facilities, housing programs etc. Each Commissioner's salary is $6,000 per year.

The Commission can take no actions unless a majority of Commissioners currently serving in office is present. All meetings are public. The Commission may override a Mayor's veto at their next regularly scheduled meeting by a two-thirds vote of those present. District elections are held every four years, with the elections of Commissioners from even-numbered districts having taken place in 2014 and those from odd-numbered districts in 2016.

In November 2012, the Miami-Dade County Term Limit Amendment was approved, modifying the County charter to establish term limits of two consecutive four-year terms.

These were the incoming board members as of December 7, 2022:

Departments
 Miami-Dade Transit oversees the largest transit system in Florida, operating the Metrorail, Metromover, and Metrobus.
 The Miami-Dade County Department of Animal Services
 The Miami-Dade County Department of Audit and Management Services 
 The Miami-Dade Aviation Department (Miami International Airport)
 The Miami-Dade County Communications Department
 The Miami-Dade County Department of Community Action and Human Services
 The Miami-Dade County Department of Corrections and Rehabilitation
 The Miami-Dade County Department of Cultural Affairs
 The Miami-Dade County Department of Elections
 The Miami-Dade County Department of Finance
 The Miami-Dade Fire Rescue Department (MDFR) is one of the top ten largest fire-rescue departments in the United States, serving residents, businesses, and visitors 24 hours per day, 365 days per year. MDFR has 69 fire rescue stations serving unincorporated Miami-Dade County and 29 municipalities. Miami-Dade Fire Rescue has an annual operating budget of $448.1 million and a $158.9 multi-year capital plan for the fiscal year 2017-18. MDFR is staffed by 2,554 employees; of which, 2,108 are uniformed firefighters.
 The Miami-Dade County Department of Human Resources
 The Miami-Dade County Department of Information Technology
 The Miami-Dade County Department of Internal Services
 The Miami-Dade County Department of Juvenile Services
 The Miami-Dade Public Library System
 The Miami-Dade County Department of Management and Budget
 The Miami-Dade County Department of Medical Examiner
 The Miami-Dade County Department of Parks, Recreation and Open Spaces Department. Miami-Dade County Parks is the third largest county park system in the United States, consisting of 270 parks and 13,573 acres of land.
 The Miami-Dade Police Department (MDPD), is the county police department serving Miami-Dade's unincorporated areas, although they have lenient mutual aid agreements with other incorporated municipalities, most often the Miami Police Department. The Director of the MDPD is also known as the Miami-Dade County Sheriff. The MDPD is the largest police department in the Southeastern United States, with approximately 4,700 employees. The Department is still often referred by its former name, the Metro-Dade Police or simply Metro. Miami-Dade Police officers are easily identified by their taupe/brown colored uniforms. Miami-Dade Police vehicles are identified by their green and white livery.
 The Miami-Dade County Department of Public Housing and Community Development (PHCD) 
 The Miami-Dade County Department of Regulatory and Economic Resources
 The PortMiami 
 The Miami-Dade County Department of Solid Waste Management
 The Miami-Dade County Department of Transportation and Public Works (DTPW)
 The Miami-Dade County Department of Vizcaya Trust (Vizcaya Museum and Gardens)
 The Miami-Dade County Department of Water and Sewer
 Jackson Health System (Public Health Trust of Miami-Dade County) was created by county ordinance effective 1 October 1973 to provide for an independent governing body (the board of trustees or board) responsible for the operation, governance, and maintenance of designated facilities.

Law
The Charter includes a Citizens Bill of Rights with provisions for: convenient access, truth in government, access to public records, the right to be heard, the right to timely notices, right to public hearing, no unreasonable postponements, prompt notice of actions and reasons, financial disclosure by candidates and other public officials, and a Commission on Ethics and the Public Trust.

Budget
The adopted budget for Miami-Dade County for the 2017–18 fiscal year was $7.412billion. The operating budget totaled $4.979billion and represented 67% of the adopted budget. The capital budget totaled $2.433billion and represented 33% of the total budget. The proposed 2018–19 fiscal year budget for Miami-Dade was expected to total $7.867billion.

See also
Government of Miami
Government of Florida

References

External links

Miami-Dade County Government, Official Website
Miami-Dade County Office of the Mayor
Miami-Dade Board of County Commissioners
Miami-Dade County Attorney's Office
Miami-Dade County Clerk of the Courts Office
Miami-Dade County Office of the Property Appraiser
Miami-Dade County Office of the Inspector General
Miami-Dade Commission on Ethics and Public Trust

County government in Florida
Government of Miami-Dade County, Florida